Christian Habicht (24 December 1952; Bad Segeberg – 15 May 2010; Dresden) was a German actor.

Plays
 Hundert Jahre Einsamkeit
 Die Sanfte
 Popcorn
 An der Arche um acht, Stück: Ulrich Hub
 Das Katzenhaus
 Nathans Kinder, Stück & Regie: Ulrich Hub
 Der Teufel mit den drei goldenen Haaren
 Hase Hasev
 Emilia Galotti, Regie: Dominik Günther
 Desaparecidos
 Die Kuh Rosmarie
 Der kleine Horrorladen
 Zement
 Faust Episode 2
 Glaube Liebe Hoffnung

Filmography
 1994: Der König – Die zwölfte Nonne
 1995: Alles außer Mord – Hals über Kopf
 1995: Auf Achse
 1996: Der König – Madonna
 2005: Hänsel und Gretel (Märchenfilm, TV)
 2005: Familie Dr. Kleist
 2005–2006: Sophie – Braut wider Willen
 2006: Leipzig Homicide
 2007: Gute Zeiten, schlechte Zeiten

References

External links 
 

1952 births
2010 deaths
People from Segeberg
German male stage actors
German male television actors
German male soap opera actors